A. N. R. Robinson International Airport (formerly Crown Point International Airport)  is an international airport located on Crown Point, Tobago in Trinidad and Tobago. The airport is one of two international airports serving the twin isle republic of Trinidad and Tobago. The other airport is located on the island of Trinidad, Piarco International Airport.

History
A. N. R. Robinson International Airport is situated on the southwestern tip of the island of Tobago.  This airport is located within walking distance of some of several of the island's beaches. The airport was commissioned in December 1940 when the Work Department laid a 670-meter (2,200 ft) landing strip.

The facilities at Crown Point were upgraded in the mid-1980s to accommodate a new terminal building, access roads, and extended apron. Further developments were commenced in 1987 and completed in 1992 to accommodate wide-bodied aircraft such as the Boeing 747. Another development program was scheduled to commence in 2011, anticipated to include an extension of the terminal building, runway works and the addition of jet bridges to the structure.

On May 19, 2011 the airport was renamed after the Tobago-born third Prime Minister of Trinidad and Tobago, A. N. R. Robinson. In 2011 according to Trinidad Express Tobago has recorded a 60% decrease in tourist arrivals, calling into question the practicality of the government's plan to further expand the airport.

Expansion 

A. N. R. Robinson International Airport has been modified and expanded starting February 2004. The project is a part of Vision 2020 and includes:

Construction of a new air traffic control tower – (PENDING)
Taxiway repairs. Delayed due to Virgin Atlantic incident, completed a few months later. – (COMPLETED)
A new airport landside transit mall – (PENDING)
Upgrade of the electrical sub station at the south terminal – (COMPLETED)
Modernization of the air traffic control facility. – (COMPLETED)
A new domestic terminal. It handles flights arriving from Trinidad and around the region. – (COMPLETED)
An Instrument Landing System. – (COMPLETED)

These works will ensure that Trinidad and Tobago maintains United States Federal Aviation Authority (FAA) Category 1 (highest) status. Plans for the construction of a new terminal at the airport were announced in the 2010–2011 budget presentation by the Government of Trinidad and Tobago.

In early 2019, the Government of Trinidad and Tobago put plans forward to completely redevelop the airport. This included a completely new terminal. The terminal would be built from scratch, replacing the current terminals. It would have an international and a domestic wing. The structure would include jetbridges for international flights. Construction of the new terminal and the associated works is said to begin in November 2019 and would be completed by December 2020.

On January 28, 2020, the government of Trinidad and Tobago announced that the contract for the construction of the new airport terminal was awarded to China railway construction Caribbean company limited, the construction is said to last for 24 months upon starting.

Terminals 

A. N. R. Robinson International Airport has two terminals. The International Terminal was once both the regional and international passenger terminal for the airport but has been renovated to serve as an all-international terminal. It serves international cargo flights, general aviation and helicopter flights. It has seven aircraft parking positions. The Regional Terminal or North Terminal is the main passenger terminal for flights to and from the Caribbean and Trinidad. It handles all regional commercial and cargo passenger airline traffic. It has six aircraft parking positions.

Airlines and destinations 
The following airlines operate regular scheduled and charter flights to and from Tobago:

Incidents and accidents 

To date, there have been no serious air incidents at the airport. A number of minor situations have occurred, including:
2005 – Tobago Express Dash 8-300, departing from Crown Point International, made an emergency landing at Piarco International Airport after the nose wheel failed to deploy. No deaths.
2007 – In October, both Crown Point International and Piarco International Airport were shut down for at least 2 days due to failed negotiations with the airport staff for better working wages. All flights operated through Crown Point and Piarco were cancelled, severely disrupting passenger travel to Caribbean and international destinations.
2009 – Crown Point International and Piarco International Airports suffered massive delays and cancellations after aircraft fuel adulterated with sulphur was discovered, rendering the fuel unusable. Flights to and from both airports were either cancelled or rescheduled.
2011 – A. N. R. Robinson International Airport was shut down at 8 p.m. on 11 August 2011 due to a Virgin Atlantic Boeing 747-400, G-VXLG, flight VS52 destined for Gatwick, London, which inadvertently encroached on a section of the airport taxiway that was undergoing repairs and was lit in red. As a result of the encroachment, one of the tires on the aircraft was blown out and the aircraft was disabled. The airport was closed while normal operations were restored, and the 452 passengers on board the disabled aircraft were disembarked.

See also
List of the busiest airports in the Caribbean

References

Airports in Trinidad and Tobago
Tobago
Airports established in 1940
1940 establishments in Trinidad and Tobago